The Sibișel is a right tributary of the river Orăștie in Romania. It discharges into the Orăștie in the town Orăștie.

References

Rivers of Romania
Rivers of Hunedoara County